Max Page may refer to:

  Major-General Sir Charles Max Page (1882-1963), a British surgeon
  Max Page (actor)

See also
 Everill Max Page, lawyer